Valeh Muslumov (September 2, 1968, Lerik, Azerbaijan – Aprel 14, 1992, Aghdara, Azerbaijan) was the National Hero of Azerbaijan, and the warrior of the First Nagorno-Karabakh War.

Life 
Valeh Muslumov was born on September 4, 1968 in Talysh family , in Lerik, Azerbaijan. In 1983, he graduated from the 8th grade of secondary school # 2 in Lerik and entered the vocational school # 17 in Sumgayit. His first work experience was in the construction trust. He served in the Azerbaijani Armed Forces in 1986–1988.

Military activities 
Valeh Muslumov began his military career in August 1991, in Special Forces of the Ministry of Internal Affairs of the Republic of Azerbaijan. He participated in battles in Shusha, Khojali, Tovuz, Fuzuli, Gubadli, Zangilan and Agdara regions. Valeh Muslumov was wounded in a fight with the Armenian army on April 14, 1992 while rescuing his soldiers in the Marqushan village of Agdere region.  One day later he died because of his wound.

Memorial 
By the Decree of the President of the Republic of Azerbaijan No. 831 dated 6 June 1992, Valeh Muslumov  was posthumously awarded the honorary title of "National Hero of Azerbaijan". In memory of Valeh Muslumov's 20th anniversary in 2012, a memorial museum was created at the school named after him.  One of the streets in the Lerik district was named after him.

References

Sources 
Vüqar Əsgərov. "Azərbaycanın Milli Qəhrəmanları" (Yenidən işlənmiş II nəşr). Bakı: "Dərələyəz-M", 2010, səh. 221.

1968 births
1992 deaths
Azerbaijani military personnel
Azerbaijani military personnel of the Nagorno-Karabakh War
Azerbaijani military personnel killed in action
National Heroes of Azerbaijan
People from Lerik District